The National Institute of Science Education and Research (NISER) is an autonomous premier public research institute in Jatani, Bhubaneswar, Odisha, India under the umbrella of Department of Atomic Energy, Govt. of India. The institute is a constituent institution of Homi Bhabha National Institute (HBNI). The prime minister, Manmohan Singh (2004–2014), laid the foundation stone on August 28, 2006, establishing the institute along the lines of the IISc in Bangalore, and its seven sister institutions, the IISERs, established at Kolkata, Pune, Mohali, Bhopal, Berhampur, Tirupati and Thiruvananthapuram in India.

Unlike the IISERs, which are governed by the Ministry of Education, Government of India, NISER operates under the umbrella of the Department of Atomic Energy (DAE). The government of India earmarked an initial outlay of  during the first seven years of the project, starting in September 2007. It was ranked 2nd in the country by the Nature Index 2020(compiled by Nature Research). It is a Constituent Institution of Homi Bhabha National Institute so the ranking of Homi Bhabha National Institute is considered the ranking for all of its constituent institutions.

Campus

The Odisha government had provided  for the permanent campus near Barunei Hills, between Bhubaneswar, the state capital and Khurda. This location is a few km southwest of Bhubaneswar.                      The institute is located at Jatani, about 35  km away from Biju Patnaik International Airport.
The campus has been built on 300 acres of land and houses both academic and residential complexes. The academic complex consists of a total built up area of 72700 m2 spread in 11 buildings, major amongst which are the Administrative block, Schools of Physics, Chemistry, Mathematics, Biology and Humanities and Social Sciences, Library, Auditorium and Meditation Centre. The residential township has a built up area of 102000 m2 comprising nine buildings for hostels, adequate numbers of faculty and staff quarters and one Director's bungalow.

NISER started shifting to the new campus during the summer vacation after 2014–15 academic session. The new batch of students joined the permanent campus at Jatni and academic activities for the session 2015-16 have started from the permanent campus. A separate  campus near the Bhubaneswar city center is also being contemplated.

Amenities

 Health Centre
 Community Centre 
 Auditorium 
 Meditation Centre 
 Computer Centre with High-Performance Scientific Computing cluster like Kalinga Cluster and Hartree Cluster
 Accommodation & Transportation
 EMW Department
 Well Integrated Library
 Aquatic Sports Complex
 Integrated Sports Complex for Basketball, Tennis, Volleyball, Cricket, Football, Table Tennis, Jogging track etc.

Logo
The logo of the institute symbolises important aspects of the four major sciences. The DNA in the centre acknowledges the discovery of its double helix structure by Watson and Crick as a major breakthrough in biology, perhaps "the most important step forward in life sciences after Darwin's theory of evolution". The benzene ring on the left represents Kekule's radical ideas that revolutionised organic chemistry and stimulated the growth of quantum chemistry and quantum optics. The object on the right depicts a black hole's event horizon, representative of the major challenges presented by the black hole to the conceptual foundations of physics, and serves as a reminder of Chandrasekhar's seminal work based on the general theory of relativity. The ornamental fractal-like structure on the boundary portrays a genus-2 compact Riemann surface of constant negative curvature, meant to reflect the beauty and elegance of mathematics, the theory of Riemann surfaces having led to significant advances in physics and neuroimaging.

Academics

Academic programmes
NISER is dedicated to undergraduate and graduate education and research only. It offers a five-year integrated MSc as well as PhD degrees in pure and applied sciences. Degrees at NISER will be awarded by the Homi Bhabha National Institute (HBNI), a deemed-to-be University within the Department of Atomic Energy. Those performing well in MSc have better chances in getting absorbed into R&D units and autonomous research institutions of the Department of Atomic Energy. Students with CGPA greater than 7.5 in the final semester exam have the chance to be directly called for interview (by skipping the main written exam) in Bhabha Atomic Research Centre (BARC). Students seeking admission in Integrated MSc-PhD programmes in NISER need to give and qualify exams like Joint Admission Test for M.Sc. (JAM). Candidates are then screened by interviews for final admission. Candidates should have qualified a national level entrance exam for PhD program (like GATE, JGEEBILS, CSIR-NET, UGC-NET, etc.).

NISER has already started Integrated PhD in Physical Science department from 2016 and currently has PhD programmes in all departments. The first batch of NISER students graduated in 2012 and many of them have clinched handsome global offers in Foreign Universities.

Integrated MSc program
Students get selected for integrated M.Sc. programs through a competitive annual examination, the National Entrance Screening Test (NEST). The first batch was admitted in September 2007. From more than 80,000 applicants nationwide in 2018, very few were qualified for admission. In upcoming years the exam is becoming more and more popular and competitive among students because many students now want to pursue their career in research and it is estimated that more than 1,00,000 students will apply per year (in the next few years) to seek admission in any of the two institutions.

PhD program
In 2010 January, NISER started offering a Doctoral Programme under the guidance of faculty members of NISER to students with a master's degree in basic sciences, e.g., Biology, Chemistry, Mathematics and Physics. To get admission, students have to qualify the - NET (CSIR/UGC) / GATE / NBHM or equivalent examination valid for the current year in the relevant area of research.

Integrated Doctoral Programme (Int. Ph.D.)
Integrated Ph.D. involves a master's degree (M.Sc.) followed by a doctorate (Ph.D.). Students after three years of undergraduate education can join the program.

M.Sc. in Medical and Radiological Physics Programme (CMRP, NISER) 
From 2022 NISER started offering M.Sc. in Medical and Radiological physics in Centre for Medical and Radiation Physics(CMRP).

Selection procedure: 60% marks in B. Sc with physics as a main course and JAM / JEST exam scorecards. The shortlisting will be based on JAM / JEST marks, followed by interview for selection.

Curriculum
To broaden the intellectual horizon of the students, there are compulsory liberal arts courses drawing from Humanities and Social Sciences areas such as; Technical Communication, Sociology, Economics, Psychology, Philosophy, etc. Each of the undergraduate students carries out research projects that last more than a year. The training makes them ready to embark on a research career by the time they graduate from NISER.

Scholarships
NISER has been included in the list of a selected few institutions where students directly qualify to receive a scholarship under the Scholarship for Higher Education (SHE) category of the INSPIRE (Innovation in Science Pursuit for Inspired Research) programme launched by Department of Science & Technology, Government of India.

 Students may also avail the Kishore Vaigyanik Protsahan Yojana scholarship if they have qualified for it.

Rankings

National Institute of Science Education and Research (NISER), Bhubaneswar was ranked 14 in the university category and 30 overall in India by National Institutional Ranking Framework (NIRF) in 2020. It is a Constituent Institution of Homi Bhabha National Institute so the ranking of Homi Bhabha National Institute is considered the ranking for all of its constituent institutions.

According to Nature Index 2020, National Institute of Science Education and Research (NISER) (a constituent institution of Homi Bhabha National Institute) was  ranked at 2nd position, behind Indian Institute of Science, among all academic institutions in India based on publications (count as well as share) during the period 1 March 2019 to 29 February 2020.

Admission
The National Entrance Screening Test or NEST is a compulsory test for admission to the 5-year Integrated MSc programme in basic sciences - Biology, Chemistry, Mathematics and Physics - at National Institute of Science Education and Research (NISER), Bhubaneswar and University of Mumbai - Department of Atomic Energy's UM-DAE CEBS, Mumbai. Both NISER and CEBS are autonomous institutions established by the Department of Atomic Energy, Government of India, in 2007.

Eligibility criteria for NEST-2022:-

 Candidates in General and OBC category should be born on or after August 1, 2002. The age limit is relaxed by 5 years for SC/ ST/ Divyangjan candidates.
 Class XII qualifying examination should be passed in either 2020 or 2021. Candidates appearing in 2022 are also eligible. (Where only Letter Grade is given by the Board, a certificate from the Board specifying equivalent percentage marks will be required. In the absence of such a certificate the decision of the respective Admission Committees will be final.)
 At least 60% marks in aggregate (or equivalent grade) in Class XII (or equivalent) examination from any recognized Board in India. For Scheduled Caste (SC), Scheduled Tribes (ST) candidates and for Divyangjan candidates, the minimum requirement is 55%.

Organisation and administration

List of schools and departments
NISER has nine schools. They are:
 School of Biological Sciences (SBS)
 School of Chemical Sciences (SCS)
 School of Mathematical Sciences (SMS)
 School of Physical Sciences (SPS)
 School of Humanities and Social Sciences (SHSS)

 School of Computer Sciences (SCoS)
 School of Earth and Planetary Sciences (SEPS)
 Centre for Medical and Radiation Physics (CMRP)
 Center for Interdisciplinary Sciences (CIS)

Notable people
 Ashoke Sen, Professor (Honorary Fellow); Shanti Swarup Bhatnagar Prize in 1994; ICTP Prize in 1989; Fellow of the Indian Academy of Sciences in 1991; TWAS Prize 1997; Fellow of the Royal Society 1998; Fellow of the Indian National Science Academy in 1996; Padma Shri in 2001; Infosys Prize in the Mathematical Sciences, 2009; Doctor of Science (Honoris Causa), 2009, awarded by IIT Kharagpur; Doctor of Science (Honoris Causa), 2011, awarded by Bengal Engineering and Science University, Shibpur (Presently Indian Institute of Engineering Science and Technology, Shibpur ); Fundamental Physics Prize, 2012, for his work on string theory; Padma Bhushan in 2013; M.P. Birla Memorial Award in 2013; Doctor of Science (Honoris Causa), 2013, awarded by Indian Institute of Technology Bombay; Doctor of Letters (honorary), 2013, awarded by Jadavpur University; Dirac Medal in 2014.
 Bedangadas Mohanty, Year 2015: Shanti Swarup Bhatnagar Prize for Physical Sciences; Year 2017: Fellow of Indian National Science Academy New Delhi. Year 2021: Infosys Prize for Physical Sciences.
 Vadapalli Chandrasekhar, Year 2003: Shanti Swarup Bhatnagar Prize for Chemical Sciences
 Tavarekere Kalliah Chandrashekar, Year 2001: Shanti Swarup Bhatnagar Prize for Chemical Sciences

Student life

Annual festival
The students of NISER hold an annual cultural festival called Udbhava, usually in the months of September/October. Many activities like fashion show, Squint (Inter-college short film competition held by the Film Club of NISER), Abhivyakti a street dance competition where some of the best dancer and dancing group take part from all over Odisha, General Quiz show, debates and discussion on current issues are held.

Utkal Dibas

Celebrated every year at NISER on 1st April in memory of the formation of the state as a separate state out of Bihar and Orissa Province with addition of Koraput and Ganjam from the Madras Presidency in 1936. All performances on Utkal Dibas are in Odia language.

Swacchta Pakhwada 2022

Swachhata Pakhwada is observed with the objective of bringing a fortnight of intense focus on the issues and practices of Swacchata by engaging GOI Ministries/Departments in their jurisdiction.

Fire Service Week 2022

Fire service week was observed at NISER from 14th April to 20th April. NISER organised a training program to spread awareness to prevent fires. Fire-athon (marathon of 5km,10km) was also organised.

See also
 List of universities in India
 List of autonomous higher education institutes in India

References

External links
 Official website
 NEST Exam

Research institutes in India
Science education in India
Homi Bhabha National Institute
Engineering colleges in Odisha
Universities and colleges in Odisha
Khordha district
Educational institutions established in 2007
2007 establishments in Orissa